Michal Zachariáš (born 15 April 1984) is a professional Czech football player who currently plays for SK Kladno. He was among the top goalscorers in the 2004–05 Czech 2. Liga. He played in three seasons of the Gambrinus liga, making 62 appearances and scoring four goals.

References

Czech footballers
1984 births
Living people
SK Kladno players

Association football forwards